Alai Payuthey is a 2000 Indian Tamil-language romantic drama film written, co-produced and directed by Mani Ratnam, starring R. Madhavan (in his Tamil debut) and Shalini. The film explores the tensions of married life between two young people who elope and the maturing of love among urban Indians who are conflicted between tradition and modernity. The score and soundtrack were composed by A. R. Rahman.

The film's story is mostly recollected in flashbacks by Karthik (Madhavan), on how he and Shakthi (Shalini) fall in love against the backdrop of Chennai and its suburban trains, against the wishes of their parents. The film had a mostly positive reception by critics.

The film made its European premiere at the Berlin International Film Festival in 2001. It was shown at various film festivals nationally and internationally. Alai Payuthey was later remade and released in Hindi in 2002, as Saathiya, directed by Ratnam's former assistant Shaad Ali.

Plot 
Karthik Varadarajan (Madhavan) is an independent and free-spirited software engineering graduate from a wealthy family who owns a startup along with his friends. At a friend's wedding, he meets Shakthi Selvaraj (Shalini), a medical student from a middle-class family. The duo constantly bumps into each other on the local commuter trains they both use and eventually fall in love. Karthik pursues Shakthi aggressively and proposes marriage. Shakthi, however, is reluctant. Karthik manages to convince Shakthi and request his parents to formally ask Shakthi's parents for her hand in marriage. However, when the parents meet, they do not get along, and Shakthi calls off the relationship altogether and leaves for an extended medical camp in Kerala.

While apart, both Karthik and Shakthi realise that they are desperately in love and decide to get married without the knowledge or consent of their parents. They continue living separate lives after marriage, meeting outside of their homes and hoping that their parents will see eye to eye at some point in the future, and can be informed of the marriage. However, when the family of a Hyundai executive Raghuraman arrives at Shakthi's house one day to discuss a prospective wedding alliance between Raghuraman and Shakthi's elder sister Poorni (Swarnamalya), developments ensue resulting in Shakthi's parents attempting to fix her marriage to Raghuraman's younger brother Shyam. Shakthi confesses to her parents and Raghuraman's family that she is already married, leading to the alliance being called off, and her parents throw her out of the house. Karthik too divulges the same to his parents and is also asked by his father to leave his house.

Karthik and Shakthi start living together in a partially-constructed apartment and while all goes well for a while, they soon find that marriage is not as easy as they expected, and living under the same roof results in a large number of conflicts. The marriage gets increasingly tense as both have to cope with frustrations and disappointments. Shakthi soon learns that her father is diagnosed with jaundice and requests Karthik to visit him at the hospital. Karthik declines, citing her father's hatred of him as the main reason. He eventually agrees to meet him the following day, but by the time they reach her house, Shakthi's father has died. Wracked with guilt, the two return home, their relationship taking a turn for the worse. The two stop talking to each other.

Meanwhile, Karthik takes it upon himself to fix Poorni's broken alliance with Raghuraman. He arranges a blind date between the two, which initially fails. However, with more meetings, Poorni and Raghuraman become closer. This development takes place without Shakthi's knowledge. Karthik waits until Poorni and Raghuraman's marriage is confirmed before deciding to tell Shakthi. But Shakthi witnesses a girl hugging Karthik in gratitude at the railway station which eventually turns out to be Poorni, and misunderstands that he is having an affair with her sister, worsening their relationship.

Shakthi eventually learns from Poorni about her husband's efforts in getting her married and is overcome with guilt. Karthik sets off on the same evening to the railway station to pick up his wife as is their usual routine. In her rush to get home and makeup with Karthik, Shakthi meets with an accident. Karthik waits for her, and as she fails to turn up searches desperately for her throughout the city, ultimately discovering her in the ICU of a hospital. Karthik learns that Shakthi is registered under another name and is in a coma after having undergone brain surgery.

An IAS officer Ram (Arvind Swamy)admits that he caused the accident and admitted Shakthi in the hospital. As Karthik vents out his frustration on Ram, his wife intervenes and lets Karthik know that she was the person who caused the accident and injured Shakthi, and her husband was merely trying to protect her by taking the blame himself. Karthik observes Ram and notes that he has a lot to learn from the latter. He proceeds to Shakthi and admits that he could have been a better husband. Shakthi wakes up from her coma and the two reconcile.

Cast 

 R. Madhavan as Karthik Varadharajan
 Shalini as Dr. Shakthi
 Jayasudha as Saroja
 Swarnamalya as Poorni
 Vivek as Sethu
 Pyramid Natarajan as Varadharajan
 Ravi Prakash as Selvaraj
 Sriranjini as Karthik's sister-in-law
 Venu Arvind as Arumugam
 K. P. A. C. Lalitha as Karthik's mother
 Sukumari as Sakthi's aunt
 Azhagam Perumal as Nayar
 Hari Nair as Raghuraman
 Karthik Kumar as Shyam
 Medha Raghunath as Karthik's colleague
 Pondy Ravi as a police officer
 Nithya Ravindran as Nayar's wife
 Arvind Swamy as Ram (guest appearance)
 Khushbu as Meena (guest appearance)
 Sophiya Haque (special appearance in the song "September Madham")

Production

Development 

Mani Ratnam opted to make a romantic film with relative newcomers after his 1998 Hindi film Dil Se.. and signed on small screen actor R. Madhavan to make his acting debut in Tamil films. Madhavan had done a sandalwood talc ad for Santosh Sivan in 1996 and the veteran cinematographer gave photographs of the actor to Mani Ratnam during the casting process of Iruvar. The director had made Madhavan audition for a role in the film but turned him down citing that "he thought his eyes were too young" and assured "that they would work together some other time". In 1999, Mani Ratnam rang Madhavan up suddenly and told him to "Come down and we will do a photo session. I am starting a film with you", much to the actor's surprise.

Casting 
Mani Ratnam initially wanted to cast a debutant in the lead female role as well and carried out a screen test with Vasundhara Das, before signing on Shalini to play the role in the film in April 1999.

Swarnamalya was selected to play the role of Poorni after the director spotted her on a television show and subsequently asked her to screen test for the film. The actress appeared without make-up in the film and also dubbed her own lines. Theatre actor, Karthik Kumar of Evam, also marked his film debut with a minor supporting role as a potential suitor to Shakti. Prior to the release of his breakthrough film Sethu (1999), Vikram was approached by Mani Ratnam to play the role of Swarnamalya's fiancé but turned down the offer. Television actress Sriranjini made her film debut with this film appearing as Madhavan's sister-in-law while Raviprakash appeared as Shalini's father thus making his acting debut with the film. Pondy Ravi appeared as a police officer, and the film is considered his "first break". Mani roped in producer Pyramid Natarajan to portray the character of Madhavan's father. Azhagam Perumal who was one of the assistant directors in the film was chosen to portray the small role of a house owner as Mani was looking for "someone like Jagathy Sreekumar to play the quirky house owner".

The film also required two leading actors to appear in supporting roles with Khushbu roped in to do a role. After considering either Shah Rukh Khan, Mammootty or Mohanlal, Mani Ratnam signed Arvind Swamy to play another role, with Alaipayuthey becoming the pair's fourth production together. P. C. Sreeram renewed his collaboration with Mani Ratnam after seven years, with the director toggling between Santosh Sivan and Rajiv Menon for his other projects. A. R. Rahman was initially signed on just to compose the background score for the film as the film was originally planned to be "songless", however after a change of heart, nine songs were recorded.

Filming 

The film began without an official launch, like other Mani Ratnam projects, and it was initially expected that filming would be wrapped up in under four months. During the first seven days of the shoot, Mani Ratnam filmed portions featuring Shalini and made Madhavan stay on the sets and watch his process of film-making. The first scene the actor shot was the post-interval scene featuring Shakthi's mother played by Jayasudha. The song sequences Evano Oruvan, and September Matham was shot at Western Plywood Guesthouse and the Dharmadam Island respectively. The team shot at Srinagar in late for 25 days, becoming the last production team to shoot in the area until 2003 as a result of the Kashmir conflict. A "meet the stars" publicity event was held at Music World in Spencer Plaza in March 2000, with the gathering being described as a success. About the production process, Madhavan revealed that he learnt about the technical aspects of film-making from the director and mentioned that he even learned the entire script of the film, irrespective of whether I was in the scene or not, claiming that working with Mani Ratnam inspires that sort of involvement and dedication.

Soundtrack 

The music score that accompanies the film was composed by A. R. Rahman. Upon release, the album met with widespread critical acclaim, selling over six lakh cassettes, and went on to win the Filmfare Award for Best Music Director in 2000. The soundtrack features 10 songs composed by Rahman, with lyrics by Vairamuthu, except for the title song "Alai Payuthey" (which was created by the 18th-century Carnatic music composer Oothukkadu Venkata Kavi, who also set it to the raagam Kanada). The song "Yaro Yarodi" later appeared in the 2008 Hollywood film, The Accidental Husband. The audio rights were sold to Saregama, a prominent music label in the 1999s.

Karthik worked as chorus singer for the film while Clinton Cerejo made his debut as playback singer. Song "Kadhal Sadugudu" provided major breakthrough for its singer S. P. Charan.

Release and reception 
Alaipayuthey was released on 14 April 2000, during Puthandu (Tamil New Year). The Hindu said, "The wavy movements are not restricted to the title card alone. Alaipayuthey goes backward and forward in time and the movement holds a thin thread of suspense too. The oscillation from joy and levity to seriousness and sorrow creates impressive waves", The lead pair performance was praised saying, "Shalini once again proves that she is a natural performer while Madhavan sails through the litmus test with ease". Similarly Indolink mentioned that "Mani's directorial mind and heart sways beautifully like his film" and that the film is "worth seeing with the whole family".

Shobha Warrier of Rediff.com gave the film a middling review citing that the film is "old wine in an old bottle" and that "the only person who scores good marks in the film is P. C. Sreeram", saying "he has used his camera as a paintbrush and the strokes are so stunningly beautiful that, once the film is over, one remembers only the visual treat". In regard to performances, the critic mentions that Madhavan "looks pleasant and handsome and does his job splendidly until the end, where he looks totally lost in the most crucial scene" and that Shalini "is very beautiful but not as open as she used to be as a child star".

Other versions 
Alaipayuthey was dubbed and released in Telugu under the title Sakhi. It was later remade in Hindi as Saathiya, by Ratnam's assistant Shaad Ali in 2002. It was the first time where the director had sold off production rights' of his films to be remade in another language as he had previously opted to dub and release the film himself.

Legacy 
Alaipayuthey began a successful film career for Madhavan and launched him as a romantic hero. He has since gone on to become a regular part of the cast in Mani Ratnam's productions and featured in leading roles in Dumm Dumm Dumm (2001), Kannathil Muthamittal (2002), Aaytha Ezhuthu (2004) and Guru (2007). Meanwhile, Shalini had already agreed to call time on her career before release due to her pending marriage with Ajith Kumar and Alaipayuthey became her penultimate release. Swarnamalya also received several film offers after her critically acclaimed performance, but consecutive failures of eight of her ten movies since failed to catapult her into the leading bracket of actors. Post-release, the actress had also expressed her disappointment at several of her scenes being edited out of the film. In July 2011, Janani Iyer said she considered a role like Shalini's character from the film as "really challenging". Gautham Vasudev Menon revealed that the scene prior to the song "Evano Oruvan" was "almost straight out of real life" and that he "tried to incorporate such moments" in his films. The film created an interest for weddings held in temple.

In popular culture 
Several other directors have made cultural references to Alaipayuthey, with both scenes and songs being alluded in their films. The scene where Madhavan proposes Shalini in the train was spoofed in Boss Engira Bhaskaran (2010) where Bhaskaran (Arya) tries to do the same with Chandrika (Nayanthara) but fails. When Madhavan saw that film, he said "It was a pleasant shock to see this clip feature in [Boss Engira Bhaskaran]. It was such a sweet tribute to me. After watching this sequence, I was quite amused to see how thin I was back then!" In Budget Padmanabhan (2000), Vivek speaks to Bhuvaneswari through cups attached with wires. Vivek utters Madhavan's dialogue from the film by mimicking his voice, he then hurts Theni Kunjarammal's eye by singing the film's song. In Majunu (2001), Vivek impresses lady by singing "Yaro Yarodi" in a telephone booth with his friends while she was speaking on the telephone but lady reveals that her husband was a police inspector, then he sings 'En Garuvam Azhindhadhadi' from the line of a song "Snegithane". In Shahjahan (2001), Vivek and Kovai Sarala's characters sing "Snegithane" in a humorous vein.

The Hindi television series Beintehaa was dubbed in Tamil as Alaipayuthe. Songs from the film inspired several film titles – Snegithiye (2000), Kadhal Sadugudu (2003), Evano Oruvan (2007), Pachai Nirame (2008), Ragasiya Snehithane (2008) and Endrendrum Punnagai (2013). The initial publicity posters of Vinnaithaandi Varuvaayaa (2010) were inspired from various films including Alaipayuthey.

Accolades

References

Bibliography

External links 
 

2000 films
2000s romantic musical films
2000s Tamil-language films
Films directed by Mani Ratnam
Films scored by A. R. Rahman
Films set in Chennai
Films set on trains
Films shot in Chennai
Films shot in Jammu and Kashmir
Films shot in Madhya Pradesh
Films shot in Uttar Pradesh
Films shot in Thalassery
Films shot in Kannur
Indian nonlinear narrative films
Indian romantic musical films
Tamil films remade in other languages